Ronald Jackson Hays (August 19, 1928 – January 11, 2021) was a United States Navy four star admiral who served as Vice Chief of Naval Operations from 1983 to 1985, and as Commander in Chief, United States Pacific Command from 1985 to 1988.

Early life
Hays was born on August 19, 1928, and raised in Urania, Louisiana, a sawmill town that was owned "lock, stock, and barrel" by the Q.T. Hardtner family. In high school, "Happy" Hays worked as the butcher's assistant in the company store. There, Mr. Hardtner took notice and succeeded in gaining a United States Naval Academy congressional appointment for "Happy."

Naval career
Hays graduated from the United States Naval Academy in 1950 and served on a destroyer for one year prior to commencing flight training. After a series of operational aviation assignments, including a tour as an experimental test pilot and two combat tours in Vietnam flying the all-weather attack A-6A Intruder, he was ordered in 1969 to the Pentagon, Washington, D.C., for duty on the staff of the Chief of Naval Operations.

Between 1969 and 1988 Hays' career path was divided between fleet aviation assignments and resource management positions in the Pentagon. During this period significant assignments included:

 Commanding Officer, Roosevelt Roads Naval Station, Puerto Rico
 Director, Navy Program Planning
 Commander, Carrier Group Four
 Director, Office of Program Appraisal
 Deputy Commander in Chief, Atlantic Forces
 Commander in Chief, United States Naval Forces Europe
 Vice Chief of Naval Operations
 Commander in Chief, United States Pacific Command

As Commander in Chief Pacific Forces, Hays commanded all United States military forces in the Pacific theater. He retired from military service in October 1988 and entered the commercial world as a director on several boards, including civic and non-profit organizations. He also served as a consultant for the Parsons Corporation, a global engineering firm.

Hays is a graduate of the Naval War College, Newport, Rhode Island; Test Pilot School, Patuxent River, Maryland; Federal Executive Institute, University of Virginia; and Flight Safety School, University of California.

Hays was awarded a Doctorate of Humanities by Northwestern State University, Natchitoches, Louisiana. In 2005, he was honored as a Distinguished Graduate of the United States Naval Academy. He was recognized as a Distinguished Eagle Scout.

Recognition for Hays' military service includes the Navy Distinguished Service Medal (4 awards), Silver Star (3 awards), Distinguished Flying Cross (7 awards), Bronze Star Medal with Valor device; Air Medal with Strike/Flight numerals, and the Navy Commendation Medal with Valor device. He also received personal awards from the heads of government of Korea, Japan, Thailand, and the Philippines and the Gray Eagle Award.

Hays was Chairman of the Board of the development of the Pacific Aviation Museum in historic Pearl Harbor.

Military awards

References

1928 births
2021 deaths
United States Navy admirals
United States Naval Academy alumni
United States Naval Aviators
Recipients of the Navy Distinguished Service Medal
Recipients of the Silver Star
Recipients of the Legion of Merit
Recipients of the Distinguished Flying Cross (United States)
Recipients of the Air Medal
Vice Chiefs of Naval Operations
People from LaSalle Parish, Louisiana